Khalilabad is a constituency of the Uttar Pradesh Legislative Assembly covering the city of Khalilabad in the Sant Kabir Nagar district of Uttar Pradesh, India. Khalilabad is one of five assembly constituencies in the Sant Kabir Nagar Lok Sabha constituency. Since 2008, this assembly constituency is numbered 313 amongst 403 constituencies.

Bharatiya Janta Party candidate Ankur Raj Tiwari is the MLA since 2022.

Members of Legislative Assembly

Election results

18th Vidhan Sabha: 2022 Assembly Elections

Bharatiya Janta Party candidate Ankur Raj Tiwari won the 2022 Uttar Pradesh Legislative Elections defeating Samajwadi Party candidate Digvijay Narayan alias Jay Chaubey by a margin of 12,622 votes.

17th Vidhan Sabha: 2017 Assembly Elections

16th Vidhan Sabha: 2012 Assembly Elections

References

External links
 

Assembly constituencies of Uttar Pradesh
Sant Kabir Nagar district